= Jordi Molina Figueras =

Spanish furniture restorer

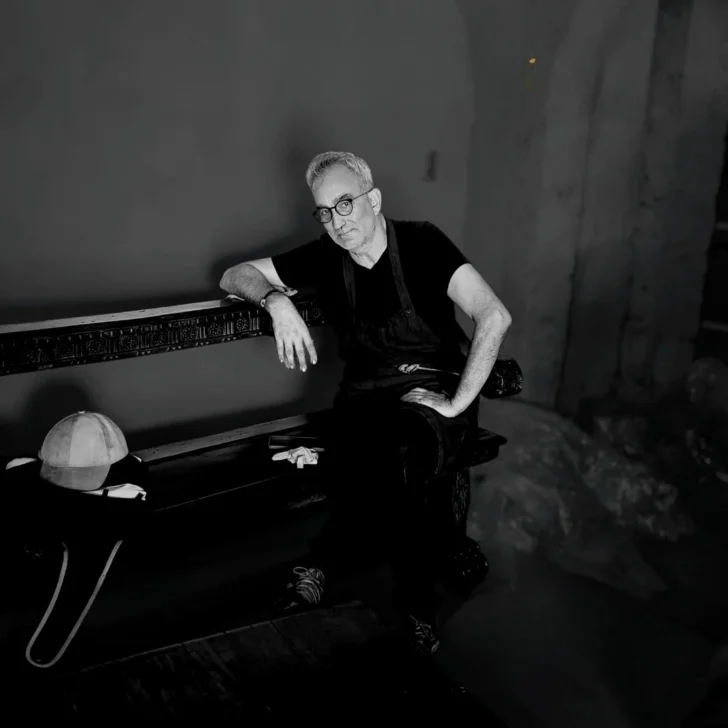
- Jordi Molina Figueras, furniture restorer
- Born: Jordi Molina Figueras; Catalonia, Spain
- Other name: Toti Kalamata
- Citizenship: Spain
- Occupation: Furniture restorer
- Years active: 1990s–present
- Known for: Restoration of historical furniture and cultural heritage pieces

Jordi Molina Figueras is a Spanish furniture restorer based in the Dominican Republic. He specializes in the conservation of historical wooden furniture and has worked in Europe and the Caribbean. In 2025, he participated in the restoration of the presidential chair of the Dominican Republic.
